State Highways or RC Roads are the major roads next to National Highways in Puducherry District designated with numbering. Public Works Department (PWD), Puducherry is primarily responsible for planning, design, construction and maintenance of RC Roads.

Divisions
PWD operates through 3 divisions for maintaining RC Roads namely-

 Building & Roads (North) abbreviated as BRN
 Building & Roads (Center) abbreviated as BRC
 Building & Roads (South) abbreviated as BRS

Roads

See also
 Puducherry road network
 Road network in Karaikal District
 Road network in Yanam District
 Road network in Mahe District

References

External links
 Official website of Public Works Department, Puducherry UT

Roads in Puducherry
Puducherry
State Highways